Nikola Nikolov (born 10 July 1986) is a Bulgarian footballer who plays as a midfielder for Master Burgas.

References

External links

1986 births
Living people
Bulgarian footballers
Association football midfielders
PFC Svetkavitsa players
PFC Pirin Gotse Delchev players
First Professional Football League (Bulgaria) players